Garbiñe Muguruza defeated the defending champion Serena Williams in the final, 7–5, 6–4 to win the women's singles tennis title at the 2016 French Open. She became the second Spaniard to win the title, after Arantxa Sánchez Vicario. Muguruza lost only one set during the tournament, to Anna Karolína Schmiedlová in the first round. Williams was attempting to equal Steffi Graf's Open Era record of 22 major singles titles. She was also attempting to become only the second player, after Graf, to complete a quadruple career Grand Slam.	

Williams retained the world No. 1 singles ranking after Agnieszka Radwańska and Angelique Kerber lost in fourth and first rounds, respectively.

The tournament marked the first time that former world No. 1 Caroline Wozniacki did not play in the main draw of a singles major (being forced to withdraw due to an ankle injury) since her major debut at the 2007 French Open, ending a streak of 36 consecutive major appearances. It also marked the first French Open main draw appearance for Jeļena Ostapenko, who would go on to win the event the following year. She lost to Naomi Osaka in the first round.

Seeds

Qualifying

Draw

Finals

Top half

Section 1

Section 2

Section 3

Section 4

Bottom half

Section 5

Section 6

Section 7

Section 8

Championship match statistics

References

External links

Draw
2016 French Open – Women's draws and results at the International Tennis Federation

Women's Singles
French Open by year – Women's singles
French Open - Women's Singles
2016 in women's tennis
2016 in French women's sport